AKD or akd may refer to:

Organisations
 AKD Group, a financial institution in Pakistan, owner of AKD Securities
 AKD motorcycles, Tyseley, Birmingham, UK
 Alpha Kappa Delta, an international honor society of sociology
 Aker Drilling, Oslo Stock Exchange symbol

Transportation
 Akdeniz Airlines (ICAO code), a former charter airline from Turkey
 Akola Airport (IATA code), India

Other uses
 Akpet language (ISO 639: akd)
 Alkyl ketene dimer; see Wet strength

See also
 AKD-10, one of the Chinese air-to-surface / anti-tank missiles